Meronera is a genus of rove beetles in the family Staphylinidae. There are at least four described species in Meronera.

Species
These four species belong to the genus Meronera:
 Meronera albicincta (Erichson, 1839)
 Meronera montana Casey, 1906
 Meronera obliqua Casey, 1906
 Meronera venustula (Erichson, 1839)

References

Further reading

External links

 

Aleocharinae
Articles created by Qbugbot